The Colorado–Kansas State rivalry is a college sports rivalry between the University of Colorado Buffaloes and Kansas State University Wildcats. The rivalry dates from their first college football game in 1912, and has continued across all sports, including basketball since their time in the Big Eight Conference joining in 1947. The rivalry intensified while the two schools were conference foes and members of the Big 12 conference from 1996 to 2010. The rivalry was renewed in 2016 for a home-and-home series in 2027 and 2028.

Series history
The All-Time Series in football is 45-20-1 led by Colorado. Both former Big 8 and Big 12 rivals Kansas State played annually against each-other in all sports from 1948 to 2010.

In 2016, Colorado football announced a renewed rivalry series between Kansas State in a home-and-home series in 2027 and 2028.

See also  
 List of NCAA college football rivalry games

References

College football
College basketball
Kansas State University
University of Colorado
Big 12 Conference
Big Eight Conference
Sports rivalries
Sports rivalries in the United States